Dick Johnson Is Dead is a 2020 American documentary film directed by Kirsten Johnson and co-written by Johnson and Nels Bangerter. The story focuses on Johnson's father Richard, who suffers from dementia, portraying different ways—some of them violent "accidents"—in which he could ultimately die. In each scenario, the elderly Johnson plays along with his daughter's black humor and imaginative fantasies. The film premiered at the 2020 Sundance Film Festival, where it won the Special Jury Award for Innovation in Non-fiction Storytelling. It was released on Netflix on October 2, 2020.

Synopsis 
Richard Johnson (referred to as "Dick") is a retired clinical psychiatrist who is suffering from dementia. His daughter Kirsten Johnson involves him in a series of imaginative enactments of his impending death, some of them violent "accidents" such as "falling down a flight of stairs, [or] being struck in the neck and bleeding out". She also has him act out his own funeral and fantasizes about him entering the gates of heaven. Dick amiably plays along with her black humor; in one scene he proposes, "You can euthanize me".

Cast 
 Kirsten Johnson
 Charles Richard "Dick" Johnson

Development 

Kirsten Johnson was inspired to make the film after having a dream in which "there was a man in a casket and he sat up and said, 'I'm Dick Johnson and I'm not dead yet'". When she pitched the idea to her father, she asked him, "Dad, what if we make a movie where we kill you over and over again until you really die? And he laughed".

The film incorporates Johnson family photographs and home movies, including that of Richard Johnson's wife who died from Alzheimer's disease in 2007.

Release 
The film premiered on January 25, 2020 at the 2020 Sundance Film Festival. It was released on October 2, 2020 via Netflix. It was released in the Criterion Collection in January 2022.

Critical response 
The critics consensus reads "Dick Johnson Is Dead celebrates a life with bittersweet humor and grace, offering a deeply resonant perspective on mortality in the bargain." Metacritic assigned the film a weighted average score of 89 out of 100, based on 28 critics, indicating "universal acclaim".

Guy Lodge, writing for Variety, said: "At once a celebration and a lament, simultaneously jubilant and ineffably sad, it's a film worth sticking around to see". Todd McCarthy of The Hollywood Reporter called the film "one of the craftiest and funniest love letters ever composed". He continued: "Technically, this is a valentine, but it's also a serious attempt on a child's part to not only share some meaningful final moments with her father but to delay the inevitable by repeatedly imagining and even enacting it for the camera". Eric Kohn writing for IndieWire pinpointed that the title of the film "doesn't lie, but it's not exactly truthful, either". He further explained that "Dick Johnson dies many times in his daughter Kirsten's poignant and personal documentary, starting with the opening credits. And yet he's very much alive the whole time, playacting in an elaborate form of cinematic therapy with his filmmaker offspring as she wrestles with the anxiety of losing him".

Nick Allen of RogerEbert.com also remarked on Johnson's "playfulness" as she stages her father's death scenes, as well as her "transparency": "And every time she abruptly cuts to a Dick death scene (BOOM! An air conditioner just fell on his head), the movie shows us the film set, the Dick stunt doubles, and Kirsten directing all of it". He concludes: "The film is not just about having these images of Johnson, but the process of it—so much that it leaves you wondering if there's more to be said about how these experimental recreations draw different lines of sensitivity for Kirsten and Dick". Alissa Wilkinson of Vox wrote: "American culture fears death, hides it, tries to forget it's going to happen, and goes to great lengths to stave it off. But Dick Johnson Is Dead suggests that learning to confront reminders of death, to even conjure them for yourself and examine them closely, takes some of the sting out of death and replaces it with love".

David Leitner of Filmmaker magazine wrote: "For humor this dark, all one can say is, like father, like daughter". Brianna Zigler of Little White Lies wrote: "Love, laughter and death are not mutually exclusive: after all, to mourn someone is to have loved them and to have known them, which is a beautiful thing – something the film illustrates quite elegantly".  Jordan Raup of The Film Stage wrote: "Dick Johnson Is Dead might be one of the most universal films ever made. Providing levity and comfort to ideas of mortality, Kirsten Johnson has illuminated the sweet embrace of death".

Accolades

References

External links 

 

2020 films
Documentary films about death
American documentary films
Documentary films about families
Metaphysical fiction films
Magic realism films
Netflix original documentary films
Sundance Film Festival award winners
Primetime Emmy Award-winning broadcasts
2020s English-language films
2020s American films